The 2013 BBL Champions Cup was the eighth edition of the super cup game in German basketball, and was played on September 28, 2013. The game was played in the O2 World in Berlin. Defending Basketball Bundesliga champions Brose Baskets took on BBL-Pokal winners Alba Berlin. Brose Baskets' Rakim Sanders was top scorer in the game, with 19 points. Alba Berlin won its first ever Champions Cup after winning the game 78–79.

Match

References

BBL Champions Cup
Champions Cup